The composing hut of Gustav Mahler (German: Gustav Mahler-Komponierhäuschen) is a little museum and memorial in Maiernigg, near Maria Wörth in Carinthia, Austria. It is dedicated to the classical composer Gustav Mahler (1860–1911). In this hut he retreated from 1900 to 1907 in order to compose music. Since 7 July 1986 a permanent exhibition can be seen here.

There is also a composing hut at the Attersee, Upper Austria, and one next to the Gustav Mahler Stube in South Tyrol, Italy.

Collection 
In a display cabinet visitors can view material that remind of the composer, like photographs, original sheet music, postcards, letters and his death certificate. A bronze bust is placed in the room. Also a little library can be consulted there.

Visitors can listen to Mahler's music, inside as well as outside the hut through loudspeakers. Since the renewal of 2016 also art expressions are allowed near the hut.

History 

Mahler came to Maiernigg in 1900 and had this composing hut built by Friedrich Theuer from 1900 to 1901. He retreated to this hut in order to compose music. At the time he was director and conductor of the court opera of Vienna (later the Vienna State Opera). The hut was of practical use for Mahler, because there was no time left for him to compose when he was in Vienna. He called the hut Study auf dem Kogel.

In Maiernigg he completed his 4th, 5th, 6th, 7th and parts of 8th Symphony. After his daughter Maria died on 12 July 1907, Mahler left his vacation home and went to Schluderbach in South Tyrol, then still part of Austria, where he spent the rest of his vacation.

The composing hut was declared a cultural heritage in 1981. In 1985, it was renovated by the Gustav Mahler society from Klagenfurt. It was opened on 7 July 1986. This society does not exist any more and the composing hut is being maintained by the city of Klagenfurt. It was renewed in 2016.

See also 
 List of museums in Austria
 List of music museums

References 

Music museums in Austria
Museums in Carinthia (state)
Museums established in 1986
1986 establishments in Austria
Biographical museums in Austria
Gustav Mahler
Historic house museums in Austria
20th-century architecture in Austria